Nikolaos (or Lakis) A. Pyrzas (1880-1947) was a Greek chieftain from Florina who contributed to the Macedonian Struggle.

Life 
He was born in Florina in 1880 and together with Pavlos Kyrou and Kottas, was one of the first chieftains who started the Macedonian Struggle in the area.

In February 1904 he went to Athens to meet Pavlos Melas, so that the defence against the IMRO could be organised, and they started acting in the region of Florina. Later he wrote to the Greek consul of Thessaloniki, Lambros Koromilas, about the need to take measures against the Bulgarian danger. Moreover, he informed the Greek consul of Bitola, Spyridon Levidis, that he was willing to form an armed group thirty-strong. He was Melas' deputy chief of staff during three expeditions in Western Macedonia.

He was with Melas in the fight that cost the life of the latter in October 1904. Before Melas died, he asked Pyrzas to give the cross he was wearing to his wife, and his weapon to his son. Lakis Pyrzas fulfilled the wish of his friend and leader and so he went to Athens, where he lived until June 1904 working for the Hellenic Macedonian Committee.

He returned to Macedonia using Pavlos Melas's nom de guerre, Mikis Zezas, under the command of Georgios Tsontos (Kapetan Vardas). After a dispute with him, Pyrzas was forced to retire; he went to Egypt and returned to Florina after the Hellenic Army liberated it in 1912.

He died in Florina in 1947.

A bust of him was erected in Florina in 1960.

Images

Sources 
 
 

People from Florina
1880 births
1947 deaths
Greek people of the Macedonian Struggle
Greek people from the Ottoman Empire